

Greek mythology
In Greek mythology Ida or Ide (Ancient Greek: Ἴδη means 'wooded mountain') may refer to the following women:

 Ida, daughter of Corybas and mother of Minos.
 Ida, one of the nurses of Zeus

Hindu mythology

In Hindu mythology Ida is goddess of speech. Ilā-Idā is also associated with Sarasvati, the goddess of knowledge.

Notes

Reference 

 Diodorus Siculus, The Library of History translated by Charles Henry Oldfather. Twelve volumes. Loeb Classical Library. Cambridge, Massachusetts: Harvard University Press; London: William Heinemann, Ltd. 1989. Vol. 3. Books 4.59–8. Online version at Bill Thayer's Web Site
 Diodorus Siculus, Bibliotheca Historica. Vol 1-2. Immanel Bekker. Ludwig Dindorf. Friedrich Vogel. in aedibus B. G. Teubneri. Leipzig. 1888-1890. Greek text available at the Perseus Digital Library.
 Graves, Robert, The Greek Myths: The Complete and Definitive Edition. Penguin Books Limited. 2017. 
 Grimal, Pierre, The Dictionary of Classical Mythology, Wiley-Blackwell, 1996. 
 Hard, Robin, The Routledge Handbook of Greek Mythology: Based on H.J. Rose's "Handbook of Greek Mythology", Psychology Press, 2004, . Google Books.
 Tripp, Edward, Crowell's Handbook of Classical Mythology, Thomas Y. Crowell Co; First edition (June 1970). .

Women in Greek mythology
Characters in Greek mythology